The 2017 Porsche Carrera Cup Germany season was the 32nd German Porsche Carrera Cup season. It began on 7 May at Hockenheimring and finished on 15 October at Hockenheimring after seven double-header meetings, It was a support championship for the ADAC GT Masters Oschersleben, Red Bull Ring and Sachsenring rounds and Deutsche Tourenwagen Masters.

Teams and drivers

Race calendar and results

Footnotes

References

External links
 
 Porsche Carrera Cup Germany Online Magazine

Porsche Carrera Cup Germany seasons
Porsche Carrera Cup Germany